Andrey Sazanov (born 25 January 1994) is a road and track cyclist from Russia. As a junior and under-23 rider he won several medals at the European Track Championships In 2015 he won as an elite the silver medal in the madison at the 2015 UEC European Track Championships  in Grenchen, Switzerland. On the road he won the third stage in the 2013 Baltic Chain Tour. He rode with the GM Cycling Team in 2015.

Major results

2013
 1st Stage 3 Baltic Chain Tour
2014
 1st Stage 3 Grand Prix of Adygeya
2018
 1st Stage 1 Five Rings of Moscow

References

1994 births
Russian male cyclists
Living people
Place of birth missing (living people)
Russian track cyclists